Pseudoxyptilus is a genus of moths in the family Pterophoridae containing only one species, Pseudoxyptilus secutor, which is known from South Africa.

The wingspan is 17–19 mm. The forewings are brownish white and the hindwings are light brown.

Etymology
The generic name reflects the superficial similarity of this genus to Oxyptilus.

References

Endemic moths of South Africa
Oxyptilini
Moths of Africa
Monotypic moth genera
Moths described in 1911